Jákup Biskopstø Andreasen (born 31 May 1998) is a Faroese footballer who plays as a midfielder for KÍ and the Faroe Islands national team. He is the nephew of Faroese international footballers Ragna Patawary and Rannvá Andreasen.

Career
Andreasen made his international debut for the Faroe Islands on 6 September 2020 in the UEFA Nations League against Andorra, which finished as a 1–0 away win.

Career statistics

International

References

External links
 
 
 
 Jákup Andreasen at FaroeSoccer

1998 births
Living people
Faroese footballers
Faroe Islands international footballers
Association football midfielders
KÍ Klaksvík players
Faroe Islands Premier League players
1. deild players